NGC 1647 is an open cluster in the constellation Taurus. It contains nearly 90 stars and it lies at a distance of 550 parsec. It is visible even with binoculars close to Aldebaran. It was discovered by William Herschel in 1784. It is located behind the Taurus dark nebula complex, approximately 160 parsec away. The brightest main sequence stars are of spectral type B7. Its age is estimated to be 150 million years.

References

External links 
 

1647
Taurus (constellation)
Open clusters